Gloria Kossak (1941–1991), Polish painter and poet, was a daughter of painter Jerzy Kossak and granddaughter of another renowned Polish painter, Wojciech Kossak, himself the son of Juliusz Kossak, the progenitor of the entire Kossak family of artists and writers, and precursor of a Polish school of battle-scene painting.

Life

Gloria Kossak was born in Kraków under the Nazi German occupation of Poland. During the postwar years, she lived with her mother and sister, Simona Kossak, at their family manor, the legendary Kossakówka, built in 1897, in metropolitan Kraków. They were constantly harassed by the communist authorities (the father, Jerzy Kossak, died before the end of Stalinism, in 1955). Their garden was confiscated and built on, and their electric power was cut back.

Afflicted by poverty, Gloria Kossak nevertheless managed to save the manor from the Kraków authorities' attempts to demolish it. The privately owned manor is, however, said to have deteriorated beyond repair.

Notes

References
 Janusz Miliszkiewicz,  Życie jest piękne, (part two, book except) at the online reading room: onet.pl Czytelnia
 Janusz Miliszkiewicz, part four, ibidem
 Janusz Miliszkiewicz, part six, ibidem
 Gloria Kossak artwork at the auction house DESA

1941 births
1991 deaths
Artists from Kraków
20th-century Polish painters
Polish women painters
20th-century Polish poets
20th-century Polish women